When a Wolf Falls in Love with a Sheep (also known as When Wolf Falls in Love with Sheep) is a 2012 Taiwanese romantic fantasy film directed by Hou Chi-jan and starring Kai Ko and Jian Man-shu.

Premise
At the Nanyang Street neighborhood in Zhongzheng District where there are many cram schools, a young man works at a copy shop making copies for test papers, with hopes of encountering his girlfriend who had broken up with him via a post-it note. One day, he notices drawings of a sheep on a piece of test paper he's printing and he sets out to find the illustrator by drawing a wolf cartoon that dialogues with the sheep in response.

Cast
 Kai Ko as Tung / Wolf	  	 
 Jian Man-shu as Hsiao Yang 	  	 
 Kuo Shu-yao as Tsui Pao-pao
 Tsai Chen-nan as Photocopy shop boss
 Lin Ching-tai as Noodle stall owner / Priest 
 Dennis Nieh as Cram school boss
 Lu Ting-wei as Fried Rice Man
 Nikki Hsieh as Tsai Yi-ying, Tung's ex-girlfriend 
 Bryan Chang as Chiang Shuo-tao, Hsiao Yang's ex-boyfriend
 Peggy Tseng as Fried Rice Man's ex-girlfriend
 Fan Hsiao-fan as Hsiao Yang's mother 
 Wu Pi-lien as Auntie Sticky Rice
 Kao Yi-ling as Chih	 
 Chuang Ching-shen as Locker renter guard  
 Lai Pei-ying as Locker renter hairdresser 
 Chou Min-fu as Enrolling student

Soundtrack

Awards and nominations

References

External links

2012 films
2010s Mandarin-language films
Taiwanese romantic drama films
Taiwanese fantasy films
2012 romantic drama films
2012 fantasy films